Adalbert Carl Friedrich Hellwig Conrad Schnizlein (15 April 1814, Feuchtwangen – 24 October 1868, Erlangen) was a German botanist and pharmacist. He is largely remembered for his work in the fields of plant taxonomy and phytogeography.

Background
He received training in pharmacy at Ansbach, afterwards becoming an assistant pharmacist in Nördlingen (1833). He later studied pharmacy at the University of Munich, earning his doctorate at the University of Erlangen in 1836. In 1845 he was habilitated in botany at Erlangen, where in 1850 he became an associate professor of botany and director of the botanical garden.

Contributions
His most extensive work, "Iconographia familiarum naturalium regni vegetabilis" (1843–1870), was issued in four volumes. A taxonomic representation of the plant kingdom, it contained 399 copper plates, and in its time, was considered to be a major work in systematics. Another significant effort by Schnizlein was a treatise on Bavarian flora, titled "Die Flora Von Bayern" (1847). He also made contributions to Carl Friedrich Philipp von Martius' "Flora Brasiliensis", to Theodor Friedrich Ludwig Nees von Esenbeck's "Genera plantarum florae germanicae" and to Jacob Sturm's "Deutschlands Flora in Abbildungen".

References

External links
 IPNI List of plants described and co-described by Schnizlein.

1814 births
1868 deaths
People from Ansbach (district)
Academic staff of the University of Erlangen-Nuremberg
19th-century German botanists
German pharmacists